Franklin Hovington (January 9, 1919 – June 21, 1982), also known as Guitar Frank, was an American blues musician. He played the guitar and banjo and sang in the Piedmont blues style. He lived in the vicinity of Frederica, Delaware.

Hovington was born in Reading, Pennsylvania. On a tip from the folklorist Peter B. Lowry, he was recorded by Dick Spottswood and Bruce Bastin, with an album released on Flyright Records in the UK (available on CD) and on Rounder Records in the US. Selections were recorded by Axel Küstner and Siggi Christmann for German release, most recently issued by Evidence Records in the US.

He disliked travel and did not play away from his Delaware home, afraid that he would lose his welfare support payments, and so did not get the publicity from music festival appearances that his talent deserved.

References

External links
 Illustrated Frank Hovington discography

1919 births
1982 deaths
Country blues musicians
Piedmont blues musicians
American blues guitarists
American male guitarists
Singers from Delaware
Musicians from Reading, Pennsylvania
Singers from Pennsylvania
20th-century American singers
20th-century American guitarists
Guitarists from Delaware
Guitarists from Pennsylvania
20th-century American male musicians